Number One Fan is a 2014 French comedy-drama film with gallic twist written and directed by Jeanne Herry and starring Sandrine Kiberlain and Laurent Lafitte.

Plot 
Vincent Lacroix is a successful singer, one of those who have everything going for them, glory, love, money. For twenty years, Muriel, an eccentric esthetician and somewhat mythomaniac, has had eyes only for him. She hasn't missed any of his concerts, watches all his appearances and buys everything he produces. One evening, Vincent's life gets out of hand. During an argument, he accidentally kills his partner.

Cast 

 Sandrine Kiberlain as Muriel Bayen 
 Laurent Lafitte as Vincent Lacroix 
 Pascal Demolon as Antoine 
 Olivia Côte as Coline 
 Nicolas Bridet as Nicolas 
 Sébastien Knafo as Sébastien 
 Muriel Mayette as Arlette  
 Benjamin Lavernhe as Guillaume  
 Hélène Alexandridis as Dabert 
 Michèle Moretti as Nicole
 Sarah Megan Allouch as Marie
 Jolan Maffi as Thomas
 Lou Lesage as Julie
 Sharif Andoura as Etienne
 Florence Viala as Louise
 Blanche Duhem as Suzanne
 Émilie Gavois-Kahn as Poker player
 Michel Drucker as Himself

Accolades

References

External links 
 

2014 films
2014 comedy-drama films
2010s French-language films
French comedy-drama films
2014 directorial debut films
StudioCanal films
2010s French films